Gokaraju Rangaraju Institute of Engineering and Technology is a private engineering college in Hyderabad, Telangana, India. GRIET is ranked by NIRF at 172nd Place

Student chapters

IEEE
School code: 41567237
Student branch code: 64761
 
The petition to form an IEEE student branch at GRIET was approved on 4 January 2006. The IEEE student branch was inaugurated on 24 February 2006, by Dr. M.B.Srinivas, Chairman, IEEE Hyderabad Section. IEEE student branch is independent of any department and the entire working body are students.

Extracurricular

Pragnya
Pragnya is the annual techno-management symposium of GRIET and is celebrated in December every year for three days. It provides paper presentations, workshops, competitions, technical quizzes, business quizzes, programming contests, design contests, and guest lectures.

Transportation
College Provides fleet of 40+ vehicles, a good mixture of buses and vans, which connects all the major places in the city so that students can board the buses according to their convenience. Buses for the faculty and students. The regular buses run from 8:00 am to 11:00 am along the Miyapur X roads while the route buses ply on their respective routes throughout the city.

Achievements and awards
 Awarded Top 20 Colleges Best Institution For the Year 2018 by The Knowledge Review Magazine
 Ranked amongst 151–200 in ENGINEERING CATEGORY by NIRF
 Ranked amongst 151–200 in OVERALL CATEGORY by NIRF
 Ranked 63 position by i3RC Times Top 150 Engineering Institute Rankings 2017
 Ranked 80 position in overall India and 8th in Telangana by Education World India in 2017
 Ranked "AAA+" by CAREERS 360, in 2017
 Ranked "Outstanding Engineering colleges of Excellence" by  CSR, in 2016
 Approved by AICTE, Permanently affiliated to JNTUH
 Accredited by NAAC with ‘A’grade, NBA for all six UG programs and two PG programs
 Autonomous Status conferred by UGC
 Recognition under section 2(f) & 12(B) of UGC
 Recognized as SIRO by DSIR
 Recipient of TEQIP PHASE-II Grant under WBA
 Received Best Principal, Teacher, Student awards in 2014 by ISTE

See also 
Education in India
Literacy in India
List of institutions of higher education in Telangana

References

External links
Official website
 Reviews
IEEE GRIET SB website
ISTE GRIET SB website
IEEE GRIET SB website
pragnya Official website

Engineering colleges in Hyderabad, India
1997 establishments in Andhra Pradesh
Educational institutions established in 1997
Engineering colleges in Telangana